Rosenborg Ballklub Kvinner (previously known as Sportsklubben Trondheims-Ørn) is a Norwegian women's professional football club in Trondheim, Trøndelag.

History 

The club was founded as a multi-sports club on May 18, 1917, and became a member of the Workers' Sports Federation in the 1920s. It was first based in Lademoen and had a clubhouse at Buran between 1946 and the 1960s. It had sections for men's football, Nordic skiing, speed skating, track and field, and swimming. Team handball followed in 1952, and ice hockey in 1961. The women's football section was established in 1972, twelve years before a national league was organized. The men's football team and all other sports were discontinued in 1984, so that only the women's football section survived.

Rosenborg Kvinner has won the Toppserien seven times, which is a record tied with LSK Kvinner. It also holds a record eight cup championships. It has also won the Nordic champions cup once.

In February 2020, the club merged with the men's football club Rosenborg BK and the name was changed from SK Trondheims-Ørn to Rosenborg BK Kvinner.

Honours
Toppserien
Winners (7): 1994, 1995, 1996, 1997, 2000, 2001, 2003
Runners-up (8): 1984, 1993, 1998, 1999, 2004, 2006, 2020, 2021

Norwegian Cup
Winners (8): 1993, 1994, 1996, 1997, 1998, 1999, 2001, 2002
Runners-up (7): 1978, 1980, 1986, 1989, 1995, 2010, 2014

Recent seasons
{|class="wikitable"
|-bgcolor="#efefef"
! Season
! 
! Pos.
! Pl.
! W
! D
! L
! GS
! GA
! P
!Cup
!Notes
|-
|2005
|TS
|align=right |4
|align=right|18||align=right|10||align=right|3||align=right|5
|align=right|31||align=right|17||align=right|33
||Quarter-final
|
|-
|2006
|TS
|align=right bgcolor=silver|2
|align=right|18||align=right|13||align=right|3||align=right|2
|align=right|47||align=right|10||align=right|42
||Semi-final
|
|-
|2007
|TS
|align=right |6
|align=right|22||align=right|9||align=right|3||align=right|10
|align=right|38||align=right|38||align=right|30
|3rd round
|
|-
|2008
|TS
|align=right |9
|align=right|22||align=right|6||align=right|5||align=right|11
|align=right|26||align=right|38||align=right|23
|3rd round
|
|-
|2009
|TS
|align=right |6
|align=right|22||align=right|9||align=right|4||align=right|9
|align=right|37||align=right|41||align=right|31
||Semi-final
|
|-
|2010
|TS
|align=right |5
|align=right|22||align=right|12||align=right|2||align=right|8
|align=right|34||align=right|29||align=right|38
|bgcolor=silver|Final
|
|-
|2011 
|TS
|align=right |6
|align=right|22||align=right|11||align=right|2||align=right|9
|align=right|45||align=right|41||align=right|35
||Semi-final
|
|-
|2012
|TS
|align=right |9
|align=right|22||align=right|6||align=right|3||align=right|13
|align=right|29||align=right|50||align=right|22
||Quarter-final
|
|-
|2013 
|TS
|align=right |7
|align=right|22||align=right|9||align=right|3||align=right|10
|align=right|39||align=right|49||align=right|30
||3rd round
|
|-
|2014 
|TS
|align=right |8
|align=right|22||align=right|7||align=right|6||align=right|9
|align=right|33||align=right|37||align=right|27
|bgcolor=silver|Final
|
|-
|2015 
|TS
|align=right |8
|align=right|22||align=right|7||align=right|3||align=right|12
|align=right|27||align=right|38||align=right|24
||Semi-final
|
|-
|2016 
|TS
|align=right |7
|align=right|22||align=right|7||align=right|6||align=right|9
|align=right|34||align=right|41||align=right|27
||Semi-final
|
|-
|2017
|TS
|align=right |8
|align=right|22||align=right|8||align=right|6||align=right|8
|align=right|36||align=right|36||align=right|30
||Quarter-final
|
|-
|2018 
|TS
|align=right |10
|align=right|22||align=right|4||align=right|6||align=right|12
|align=right|25||align=right|48||align=right|18
||Quarter-final
|
|-
|2019 
|TS
|align=right |7
|align=right|22||align=right|8||align=right|5||align=right|9
|align=right|26||align=right|22||align=right|29
||Semi-final
|
|-
|2020
|TS
|align=right bgcolor=silver|2
|align=right|18||align=right|10||align=right|8||align=right|0
|align=right|34||align=right|16||align=right|38
||Quarter-final 
|
|-
|2021 
|TS
|align=right bgcolor=silver|2
|align=right|18||align=right|16||align=right|0||align=right|2
|align=right|42||align=right|15||align=right|48
||Semi-final
|
|-
|rowspan=2|2022
|rowspan=2|TS
|rowspan=2 align=right bgcolor=cc9966| 3
|align=right|18||align=right|13||align=right|2||align=right|3
|align=right|40||align=right|12||align=right|41
|rowspan=2|Semi-final
|rowspan=2|
|-
|align=right|6||align=right|2||align=right|1||align=right|3
|align=right|7||align=right|8||align=right|11
|}
Source:

First-team squad

References

External links
 Official website

Rosenborg BK
Women's football clubs in Norway
Association football clubs established in 1917
Sport in Trondheim
Defunct athletics clubs in Norway
Arbeidernes Idrettsforbund
1917 establishments in Norway